Founded in 1926, the Rumson Country Day School is a coeducational, nonsectarian independent day school located on a  campus in Rumson, New Jersey, specializing in educating boys and girls from nursery (age three) through eighth grade. The Rumson Country Day School has probationary accreditation from the Middle States Association of Colleges and Schools and is a member of the New Jersey Association of Independent Schools.

Awards and recognition 
For the 1998-99 school year, The Rumson Country Day School received the Blue Ribbon Award from the United States Department of Education, the highest honor that an American school can achieve.

School population 
As of the 2013-14 school year, the school has an enrollment of 458 students (in K-8, plus 42 in Pre-Kindergarten) and 70 classroom teachers, for a student-teacher ratio of 7.14:1. In Grades N-5, students are divided into heterogeneous homerooms with a maximum size of 16 students per homeroom. In Grades 6-8, classes are departmentalized and honors sections are offered in English, math and foreign language (French and Spanish only). The Rumson Country Day School has 62 full-time and 4 part-time teachers. Teachers have an average of 18 years of experience, with 13 of those years at RCDS. The school has a student/teacher ratio of 7:1 and average class size of 15.

Classes 
The school offers a traditional curriculum of English grammar and literature, mathematics, science, social studies, foreign language (French and Latin, with Spanish added in the 1960s), art, crafts, shop, music and physical education. The school also offers a SWS program which stands for School Within A School, which helps children with learning disabilities.

In September 2010, the school officially opened the new William I. Riker Academic Center, an addition covering  that includes a new main library, new computer lab and art rooms, a seminar room and three new age-specific science labs.

Sports 
Interscholastic sports were started at RCDS in 1946.  Sports are played throughout the academic year.  Fall sports are soccer (boys and girls), football, and field hockey.  Winter sports include: basketball (boys and girls), and ice hockey: started in 2007 with one game which was won 4-0 against Princeton Day School.  Spring sport include lacrosse (boys and girls), baseball, and softball.

Notable alumni
 Joe Kyrillos (born 1960) politician and businessman who served in the New Jersey Senate and the New Jersey General Assembly.
 Jessica Springsteen (born 1991), equestrian who won a silver medal in the Team jumping at the 2020 Summer Olympics held in 2021 in Tokyo.

References

External links
Rumson Country Day School website
Data for Rumson Country Day School, National Center for Education Statistics
Private School Review, Rumson Country Day School
Great Schools Review, Rumson Country Day School

1926 establishments in New Jersey
Educational institutions established in 1926
Private elementary schools in New Jersey
New Jersey Association of Independent Schools
Rumson, New Jersey
Schools in Monmouth County, New Jersey
Private middle schools in New Jersey